Étienne Comar (born 25 January 1965) is a French film producer, screenwriter and film director. He is known for producing the films Of Gods and Men (2010) and Timbuktu (2014), for which he won the César Award for Best Film as producer in 2011 and 2015. In 2017, his directorial debut Django was selected to open the 67th Berlin International Film Festival.

Filmography

References

External links
 

1965 births
Living people
French screenwriters
French film producers
Film directors from Paris